Ayaka's History 2006–2009 is Ayaka's first compilation album, released on September 23, 2009. The album was released in three versions: 2CD+DVD (limited), 2CD+Photo book (limited) and a regular one disc edition.

The album is certified Million by Recording Industry Association of Japan (RIAJ) for shipment of 1,000,000 copies.

Track listing

Charts

Charts

Certifications

References

External links
Ayaka Official Web Site

Ayaka albums
2009 greatest hits albums
Pop compilation albums
Warner Music Japan compilation albums